Tse Kang is a town in Lhuntse District in northeastern Bhutan.

References

External links
Satellite map at Maplandia.com

Populated places in Bhutan